is a Japanese voice actor affiliated with 81 Produce.

Voice roles

Anime television
 Noir (2001) – Heinz
 Kurau Phantom Memory (2004) – Mike
 Madlax (2004) – Charlie
 Monkey Turn (2004) – Kenji Hatano
 Rockman.EXE Stream (2004) - Yuichiro Hikari
 Emma - A Victorian Romance (2005) – Willam Jones
 Gakuen Alice (2005) – Subaru Imai
 Honey and Clover (2005) – Matsumoto Ippei (ep 12-13)
 Naruto (2005) – Jibachi Kamizuru
 Rockman.EXE Beast (2005) - Yuichiro Hikari, Zoano Numberman
 D.Gray-man (2006) – Mark (ep 1)
 Ghost Slayers Ayashi (2006) – Houzaburo Ogasawara
 Hataraki Man (2006) – Furukawa (ep 8)
 Saru Get You -On Air- (2006) – Ukki Blue
 Rockman.EXE Beast+ (2006) - Yuichiro Hikari, Zero One
 El Cazador de la Bruja (2007) – Pedro
 Oh! Edo Rocket (2007) – Akai Nishinosuke
 Shooting Star Rockman - Wolf
 Blade of the Immortal (2008) – Takayoshi Asano
 Mobile Suit Gundam 00 (2008) – Klaus Grad
 RIN ~Daughters of Mnemosyne~ (2008) – Kei Tajima
 Sands of Destruction (2008) – Morte's father
 Corpse Princess: Aka (2008) – Takamasa Sogi
 Corpse Princess: Kuro (2009) – Takamasa Sogi
 Guin Saga (2009) – Deelan
 Katanagatari (2010) – Takahito Hida
 Pokémon (2010) – Hawes
 Psychic Detective Yakumo (2010) – Yuutarou Ishii
 Hunter × Hunter (Second Series) (2012) – Kastro
 Mysterious Girlfriend X (2012) – Hiroyuki Tsubaki
 Shirokuma Cafe (2012) – Rintaro Hayashi
 Sword Art Online (2012) – Kains
 Pokémon Origins (2013) – Wataru (Lance)
 Silver Spoon (2013) – Mr. Shiroishi
 Concrete Revolutio (2015) - Hyōma Yoshimura
 JoJo's Bizarre Adventure: Diamond Is Unbreakable (2016) – Tonio Trussardi
 My Hero Academia (2016) – Naomasa Tsukauchi
 Gabriel DropOut (2017) – Satania's Father
 Dragon Quest: The Adventure of Dai (2021) – Block
 Moriarty the Patriot (2021) – Zach Patterson
Unknown date
 Fullmetal Alchemist: Brotherhood (????) – Riddle
 Major (????) – Takeshi Saotome
 Saint Seiya Omega (????) – Equuleus Kitalpha
 Saiyuki (????) – Purple Demon
 Saiyuki Gunlock (????) – Doshi
 Tsubasa: Reservoir Chronicle (????) – Fujitaka (Syaoran's father)
 Tsubasa Tokyo Revelations (????) – Yuto
 Wangan Midnight (????) – Koichiro Aizawa and Masaki
 Zatch Bell! (????) – Galliont

Theatrical animation
 Pokémon: The Movie 2000 (1999) – Kamex
 Ah! My Goddess: The Movie (2000) – Miwa
 Rockman.EXE: Hikari to Yami no Program (2005) - Yuichiro Hikari
 Tamagotchi: The Movie (2007) – Papamametchi
 Un-Go: Episode 0 (2011) – Makiro Serada
 Lu over the Wall (2017) - Fuguda
 Detective Conan: Zero the Enforcer (2018) – Makoto Kusakabe

Video games
 Tactics Ogre: Reborn (2022) – Hektor Didarro

Dubbing

Live-action
James Van Der Beek
 Dawson's Creek – Dawson Leery
 Varsity Blues – Jonathon "Mox" Moxon
 Jay and Silent Bob Strike Back – James Van Der Beek
 Medium – Dylan Hoyt (episode "All in the Family")
 The Rules of Attraction – Sean Bateman
 The 39 Steps – Richard Hannay (Rupert Penry-Jones)
 The Aftermath – Stefan Lubert (Alexander Skarsgård)
 Almost Human – Dorian (Michael Ealy)
 American Pie Presents: Band Camp – Matthew "Matt" Stifler (Tad Hilgenbrink)
 American Pie Presents: The Naked Mile – Erik Stifler (John White)
 Anywhere but Here – Benny (Shawn Hatosy)
 Around the World in 80 Days (2008 TV Tokyo edition) – Bak Mei (Daniel Wu)
 Aquamarine – Raymond (Jake McDorman)
 Ballistic: Ecks vs. Sever – Agent Harry Lee (Terry Chen)
 Band of Brothers – Sergeant Warren "Skip" Muck (Richard Speight Jr.)
 The Beach – Étienne (Guillaume Canet)
 The Big Bounce – Jack Ryan (Owen Wilson)
 Black Panther: Wakanda Forever – Griot (Trevor Noah)
 Blackout – Tommy
 The Book Thief – Max Vanderburg (Ben Schnetzer)
 The Break-Up Artist – Mike (Ryan Kennedy)
 Brideshead Revisited – Charles Ryder (Matthew Goode)
 Bride Wars – Nathan "Nate" Lerner (Bryan Greenberg)
 A Bridge Too Far – Major Julian Cook (Robert Redford)
 Bring It On: All or Nothing – Brad Warner (Jake McDorman)
 The Captive – Det. Jeffrey Cornwall (Scott Speedman)
 Chappie – Chappie (Sharlto Copley)
 Chasing Papi – Tomás "Papi" Fuentes (Eduardo Verástegui)
 Chicago Med – Dr. Connor Rhodes (Colin Donnell)
 Children of Men – Patric (Charlie Hunnam)
 City by the Sea – Joey LaMarca (James Franco)
 The Claim – Donald Dalglish (Wes Bentley)
 Coma – Dr. Mark Bellows (Steven Pasquale)
 The Company You Keep – Ben Shepard (Shia LaBeouf)
 The Crow: Salvation – Alex Corvis/The Crow (Eric Mabius)
 The Crown – Prince Philip, Duke of Edinburgh (Matt Smith)
 Darkness – Carlos (Fele Martínez)
 Daylight – Vincent (Sage Stallone)
 Death on the Nile – Linus Windlesham (Russell Brand)
 Devil's Pass – Jensen Day (Matt Stokoe)
 The Diary of a Teenage Girl – Monroe Rutherford (Alexander Skarsgård)
 Dirt – Leo Spiller (Will McCormack)
 District 9 – Wikus van der Merwe (Sharlto Copley)
 Doctor Who – The Eleventh Doctor (Matt Smith)
 Driven – Jimmy Bly (Kip Pardue)
 El tiempo entre costuras – Marcus Logan (Peter Vives)
 En liten julsaga – Jakob (Jesper Salén)
 Endless Love – David Elliot (Alex Pettyfer)
 Eternal Sunshine of the Spotless Mind – Stan Fink (Mark Ruffalo)
 EuroTrip – Cooper Harris (Jacob Pitts)
 Everwood – Colin Hart (Mike Erwin)
 Failure to Launch – Philip "Ace" (Justin Bartha)
 Fast & Furious 6 – Han Seoul-Oh (Sung Kang)
 F9 – Han Lue (Sung Kang)
 Fight Club – Angel Face (Jared Leto)
 Fleming: The Man Who Would Be Bond – Ian Fleming (Dominic Cooper)
 Flyboys – William Jensen (Philip Winchester)
 The Forsaken – Sean (Kerr Smith)
 The Four Feathers – Tom Willoughby (Rupert Penry-Jones)
 Futuresport – Akira Otomo (Hiro Kanagawa)
 Gia – T.J. (Eric Michael Cole)
 Godmothered – Hugh (Santiago Cabrera)
 The Good Doctor – Dr. Neil Melendez (Nicholas Gonzalez)
 Gormenghast – Steerpike (Jonathan Rhys Meyers)
 Gran Torino – Father Janovich (Christopher Carley)
 Green Lantern – Dr. Hector Hammond (Peter Sarsgaard)
 Harry's Law – Adam Branch (Nate Corddry)
 Harry Potter and the Philosopher's Stone – Oliver Wood (Sean Biggerstaff)
 Harry Potter and the Chamber of Secrets – Oliver Wood (Sean Biggerstaff)
 Harry Potter and the Deathly Hallows – Part 2 – Oliver Wood (Sean Biggerstaff)
 The Hole – Martyn Taylor (Daniel Brocklebank)
 The Hollars – Ron Hollar (Sharlto Copley)
 Hot Rod – Dave McLean (Bill Hader)
 House of the Dead – Rudy Curien (Jonathan Cherry)
 How Do You Know – Matty Reynolds (Owen Wilson)
 I Love You, Man – Peter Klaven (Paul Rudd)
 Initial D Live Action - Takeshi Nakazato (Shawn Yue)
 Insomnia – Randy Stetz (Jonathan Jackson)
 The Intern – Matt Ostin (Anders Holm)
 Into the Blue 2: The Reef – Carlton (David Anders)
 Ip Man – Li Chiu (Gordon Lam)
 Jersey Boys – Frankie Valli (John Lloyd Young)
 Jersey Girl – Arthur Brickman (Jason Biggs)
 John Tucker Must Die – John Tucker (Jesse Metcalfe)
 Julie & Julia – Eric Powell (Chris Messina)
 Just Married – Peter Prentiss (Christian Kane)
 K-19: The Widowmaker – Lieutenant Vadim Radtchenko (Peter Sarsgaard)
 Lara Croft: Tomb Raider – Mr. Pimms (Julian Rhind-Tutt)
 Last Days – Luke (Lukas Haas)
 LAX – Nick (David Paetkau)
 Legally Blonde – Warner Huntington III (Matthew Davis)
 Logan – Caliban (Stephen Merchant)
 Loser – Chris (Thomas Sadoski)
 Love & Other Drugs – Trey Hannigan (Gabriel Macht)
 Malignant – Detective Kekoa Shaw (George Young)
 Mars Attacks! – Richie Norris (Lukas Haas)
 The Matrix – FedEx Man
 The Meg – James "Mac" Mackreides (Cliff Curtis)
 Meteor Storm – Kyle Kembler (Eric Johnson)
 The Midnight After – Shun (Chui Tien-you)
 Miss March – Eugene Bell (Zach Cregger)
 The Mists of Avalon – Mordred (Hans Matheson)
 Mrs Dalloway – Septimus Warren Smith (Rupert Graves)
 The Musketeer – d'Artagnan (Justin Chambers)
 My Lovely Sam Soon – Min Hyun-woo (Lee Kyu-han)
 Narcos – César Gaviria (Raúl Méndez)
 Needful Things – Deputy Norris Ridgewick (Ray McKinnon)
 Odyssey 5 – Neil Taggart (Christopher Gorham)
 The Pacific – Capt. Andrew Haldane (Scott Gibson)
 Patient Zero – Morgan (Matt Smith)
 The Patriot – Gabriel Martin (Heath Ledger)
 Penelope – Edward Humphrey Vanderman III (Simon Woods)
 Penny Dreadful – Victor Frankenstein (Harry Treadaway)
 The Pillars of the Earth – Richard (Sam Claflin)
 Platoon (2003 TV Tokyo edition) – Lerner (Johnny Depp)
 Pride and Prejudice and Zombies – George Wickham (Jack Huston)
 The Purifiers – Sol (Dominic Monaghan)
 Red – William Cooper (Karl Urban)
 Road Trip – Rubin Carver (Paulo Costanzo)
 Rock Star – Chris "Izzy" Cole (Mark Wahlberg)
 Romeo Must Die – Colin O'Day (D. B. Woodside)
 Scary Movie – Bobby Prinze (Jon Abrahams)
 Small Soldiers – Brad (Jonathan Bouck)
 So Close – Yen (Song Seung-heon)
 Steve Jobs – Steve Jobs (Michael Fassbender)
 Stealth – EDI (Wentworth Miller)
 Stop-Loss – SGT Steve Shriver (Channing Tatum)
 Superbad – Officer Slater (Bill Hader)
 Superman Returns – Jimmy Olsen (Sam Huntington)
 Surrogates – Dr. Lionel Canter (James Cromwell)
 Tempo – Jack Ganzer (Hugh Dancy)
 The Terminal – Enrique Cruz (Diego Luna)
 Thelma & Louise – J.D. (Brad Pitt)
 Third Star – Davy (Tom Burke)
 Tuck Everlasting – Jesse Tuck (Jonathan Jackson)
 The Twilight Zone – Raff Hanks (John Cho)
 The Virgin Suicides – Trip Fontaine (Josh Hartnett)
 The Vow – Leo Collins (Channing Tatum)
 When in Rome – Gale (Dax Shepard)
 Wild – Greg (Kevin Rankin)
 X2 – John Allerdyce/Pyro (Aaron Stanford)
 X-Men: The Last Stand – John Allerdyce/Pyro (Aaron Stanford)
 Zodiac – Robert Graysmith (Jake Gyllenhaal)

Animation
 Batman Beyond – Terry McGinnis/Batman
 Batman Beyond: Return of the Joker – Terry McGinnis/Batman
 Big Hero 6 – Baymax
 Bionicle 2: Legends of Metru Nui – Nuju
 Isle of Dogs – Rex
 Justice League Unlimited – Terry McGinnis/Batman
 Love, Death & Robots – Torrin
 Peppa Pig – Narrator
 Static Shock – Terry McGinnis/Batman
 Teenage Mutant Ninja Turtles – Casey Jones
 The Zeta Project – Terry McGinnis/Batman
 Thomas & Friends – Stafford and Rusty (succeeding Rusty from Hideo Ishikawa)
 TMNT – Casey Jones
 Watership Down – Hazel
 Luna Petunia'' - Sammy Stretch

References

External links
 
 

1973 births
Japanese male video game actors
Japanese male voice actors
Living people
Male voice actors from Tokyo
20th-century Japanese male actors
21st-century Japanese male actors
81 Produce voice actors